"Thodi Der" (English: Stay a Little Longer) is a popular song from the soundtrack of the Bollywood film Half Girlfriend. The song was composed by Pakistani singer Farhan Saeed, who originally performed the song (titled "Tu Thodi Dair") with established Indian singer Shreya Ghoshal.

Background
The version heard in Half Girlfriend is revamped from an earlier tune by Pakistani singer Farhan Saeed, while he was with the band Jal Band. It was originally composed in Punjabi. In the movie, an English-dubbed version, "Stay a Little Longer", is performed by Anushka Shahaneya.

Release and lyrics
The song was released on 25 April 2017 and Half Girlfriend came out on 19 May 2017.

The original version, sung by Farhan Saeed, received an overwhelming response from the public, with the music video on YouTube garnering four million views in a single day.
As of June 2017, the song's music video has garnered 23 million views.

The version sung in Half Girlfriend reached 50 million views as of September 2017.

The song has been viewed more than 222 million times on YouTube as of February 2023.

Personnel

 Farhan Saeed and Shreya Ghoshal – vocals
 Ali Mustafa – keyboards
 Ankur Mukherjee – guitar
 Aditya Oke – harmonium
 Murad Ali Khan – sarangi

 Farhan Saeed – music
 Kumaar – lyrics
 Dj Phukan – arrangements and programming
 Assista Madhab Deka – co-arrangements
 Pankaj Borah and Bhaskar Sarma – engineering
 Eric Pillai (Future Sound of Bombay) – mixing and mastering
 Michael Edwin Pillai and Lucky. – assistant mixing

Critical reception
Critics generally gave "Thodi Der" positive reviews, describing the song as "soulful", with one reviewer stating that "Shraddha Kapoor and Arjun Kapoor’s chemistry does full justice to the latest track"

India.com described the song as "extremely soothing", and "the sarangi played by Murad Ali Khan adds to the charm of the song" The English version, "Stay a Little Longer", was described as "a combination of western and Indian music."

In a critique of the song, News18.com did not comment on the song itself, but described it as an insensitive production of Bollywood, questioning why the two instruments of the tabla and dafli were included in the video without seeming to be played, and pointing out the music video as being shot in front of Humayun's tomb in Delhi.

Accolades

References

2017 songs
Songs written for films
Hindi film songs
Shreya Ghoshal songs
Songs with music by Farhan Saeed
Songs with lyrics by Kumaar